Yang Yo-seob (born January 5, 1990), more commonly known as Yoseob, is a South Korean singer and musical actor. He is the main vocalist of the boy group Highlight.

Biography
Yang was born in Seoul, South Korea on January 5, 1990, in a small family with one older sister, Yang Hae-yeon. His name Yoseob was the Hanja version of the name Joseph, which was later sinicized by the  decision of his grand father. He first gained interest in music and started practicing singing after listening to Brian McKnight's music. He then listened to a lot of music of a similar style, but realized that he should not be biased towards a certain genre and started listening to dance music and rock as well. When he was in high school, he joined a school band where he performed a lot of hard rock and metal during their performances. Yang wanted to try modern rock; however, his seniors at that time said that it would ruin the mood and ultimately not be a success.

Yang became a JYP Entertainment trainee, but left after receiving a bad grade from practice reviews. He moved agencies, to M Boat Entertainment (a former sister company of YG Entertainment) where he was trained for five years before transferring to Cube Entertainment where he became a member of Beast. While still a trainee at Cube Entertainment, he became a backup dancer for AJ, his soon-to-be group member and former high school friend, now known as Lee Gi-kwang, in the music videos and live performances of "Wiping the Tears" and "Dancing Shoes".

Yang is the main vocalist of Beast. He released a digital single together with Dalmatian's Daniel titled "First Snow and First Kiss"  and participated in singing original sound tracks (OSTs) for various Korean dramas such as "Happy Birthday" for More Charming by the Day and "I Cherish That Person" for My Princess. and "Loving You" – for All My Love. Yang has also participated in various TV shows, including KBS' "Oh! My School".

Yang Yoseob attended Dong-ah Institute of Media and Arts, formerly known as Dong-Ah Broadcasting College, and graduated in 2014.

On January 24, 2019, Yang began his mandatory military service as a conscripted police officer and was discharged on August 30, 2020.

Career

Highlight (formerly known as Beast) 

The group has released five studio albums, thirteen Korean EPs and various singles. Yang is the main vocalist.

Solo career 
Along with fellow Beast member Junhyung, MC Lee Hyukjae, Moon Heejun (formerly of H.O.T.) and Kim Sook, Yang welcomed Japanese tourists for the "Visit Seoul 2010" campaign, where Korean celebrities and Japanese tourists explored Seoul through MBC's Star Guide Doshiraku to boost visibility of Seoul's famous landmarks and cuisine. On July 16, 2010, Yang participated in the official soundtrack of the Korean drama More Charming By The Day as part of its promotional campaign, with the song "Happy Birthday".

On November 29, 2010, Yang released a digital single together with Dalmatian's Daniel titled "First Snow and First Kiss". Both were friends from their trainee years at M Boat Entertainment and had released a UCC series, "To Pick On Mr. Daniel", which became a hot topic when it was selected as number one amongst the weekly TOP 5 UCCs by a sports newspaper. He also became a permanent cast member on KBS' Oh! My School (a.k.a. 100 Points out of 100), along with other idols such as MBLAQ's Lee Joon, Secret's Hyoseong, T-ara's Soyeon, Miss A's Min, and Simon Dominic.

Yang was cast in his first musical as Ji Yong in Kwang Hwa Moon Love Song. The musical started its performances on March 20, 2011, and ended on April 10, 2011. He also contributed to the soundtrack of My Princess, with the song "Cherish That Person" which was released on February 7, 2011. On May 1, 2011, KBS announced plans of creating a new singing variety program featuring an all idol cast titled Immortal Songs 2 – Sing the Legends; Yang was one of the artists cast in the original line-ups. He received first place on the show's pilot episode with his performance of "Eomma (엄마, lit. Mother)", which helped silence the critics that had dismissed his singing abilities as just a hype. However, on June 8, 2011, the show announced that Yang would leave the show due to his conflicting overseas promotions schedule with Beast. He expressed that although he felt extremely stressed competing against his peers, he felt regret having to leave. Yang said "when we decided on the withdrawal, I did feel some relief. It was too nerve-wracking and burdensome. However, at the same time, I felt regret. I don't think I was able to show my all. If another opportunity came by to be on the show again, I would definitely take it. I think I will. I want to show different sides of myself."

Yang was featured in Bang Yong-guk's first solo track, "I Remember" which was jointly composed by Bang and One Way's Chance. The track has gained a lot of interest from netizens and become a hot topic. Yang was not able to sing "I Remember" with Bang Yongguk live.

On September 27, 2011, KBS' 'Poseidon' released part one of their original soundtrack series which featured Yang’s vocals. His song, "No", was a collaboration piece between Rado (of Huh Gak's "Hello") and production duo Ji In and Wontag, the men behind MBLAQ's latest releases. The song features sorrowful lyrics of a man who has no choice but to let go of his lover.

Yang released his solo album on November 26, 2012. All five songs were produced by fellow band member, Jun Hyung, including the title song, "Caffeine". A music video for "Caffeine" was released two days later, on November 28. A music video for his song "Even then, I" was released on February 14, 2013, as a valentines gift for his fans.

Yang was chosen as one of the judges and coaches in Mnet The Voice Korea Kids or Voice Kids for short. The contestants were between the ages of 6–14 years old. He was also chosen as the most desired coach by the contestants of Voice Kids.

Yang joined MBC's I Live Alone, a real-variety show that showcases the daily lives of single celebrities (men) who live alone.

In December 2013, he starred as the title character in a Seoul production of Joseph and the Amazing Technicolor Dreamcoat and was mentioned in the New York Times.

Yang left I Live Alone in which he received much love as the youngest member of the show after a short six months on broadcast due to his responsibilities and schedules as a member of Beast. He said that due to their  Japan Tour 2014, along with their upcoming comeback planned to be in April 2014, he would be unable to participate in the show.

It was announced in March 2014 that Yang would be participating in the musical-remake of the 2004 hit romantic comedy drama series Full House as the lead character, Lee Young-jae. The musical was on stage in April 2014.

On September 20, 2021, Yang released his first studio album Chocolate Box, with "Brain" serving as the lead single.

Discography

Studio albums
 Chocolate Box (2021)

Songwriting credits

Filmography

Variety shows

Television dramas

Web shows

Musical theatre

Radio show

Concerts

Korean tours 
 2018 YANG YOSEOB Solo Concert <白> - Kyunghee University Grand Peace Palace, Seoul (June 16–17, 2018)

Awards & nominations

Golden Ticket Awards 

|-
| 2012
| Himself 
| Musical Rising Star Award
| 
|-

Mnet Asian Music Awards 

|-
| 2013
| "Caffeine"
| Best Dance Performance – Male Solo
| 
|-

SBS MTV Best of the Best 

|-
| 2013
| "Caffeine"
| Best Male Artist
| 
|-

Golden Disc Awards 

|-
| 2018
| "白"
| Bonsang (Album)
| 
|-

MBC Entertainment Awards 

|-
| 2018
| Himself
| Best Newcomer Award (Radio)
| 
|-

References

External links

Highlight (band) members
1990 births
K-pop singers
Living people
Cube Entertainment artists
South Korean male singers
South Korean pop singers
South Korean dance musicians
South Korean male idols
People from Seoul
21st-century South Korean singers
Dong-ah Institute of Media and Arts alumni
21st-century South Korean male actors